The World Para Alpine Skiing Championships, known before the 2017 edition as the IPC Alpine Skiing World Championships, along with the Winter Paralympic Games, are the most prestigious level of international competition in Paralympic alpine skiing.  First held in 1974, the World Championships have been held every four years (even-numbered non-Paralympic years) from 1982 to 2004; beginning in 2009, they have been held every other year, in odd-numbered years.

The change from holding the World Championships every four years to every two was originally set to happen in 2007.  The 2007 edition was slated for Klosters, Switzerland, but organizers withdrew their bid in early 2006, citing a lack of funding.  The International Paralympic Committee initially attempted to find a replacement host for the 2007 Championships but in April decided to cancel the event entirely.

On 30 November 2016, the IPC, which serves as the international governing body for Alpine skiing involving competitors with disabilities, adopted the "World Para" branding for the committees that govern all disability sports for which it serves as the international federation. Accordingly, IPC world championship events in Alpine skiing have since been known as "World Para Alpine Skiing Championships".

Hosts

Medal table (2009)

See also
 FIS Alpine World Ski Championships
 World Junior Alpine Skiing Championships
 Alpine skiing at the Winter Olympics
 Alpine skiing at the Winter Paralympics
 Alpine skiing at the Youth Olympic Games
 Alpine skiing World Cup
 Para Alpine Skiing World Cup

References

External links

 
Alpine skiing competitions
Alpine
Para
Recurring sporting events established in 1974